Cheryl LaFleur is an American attorney, executive, and government official who served as one of the 5 Commissioners of the Federal Energy Regulatory Commission (FERC) from 2010 to 2019.  During her tenure as a Commissioner, she served as Chairman or Acting Chairman November 25, 2013 - April 14, 2015 and again January 23, 2017 - August 10, 2017.  In September 2019, she was elected to the Board of Directors of ISO New England, beginning October 1, 2019.

Prior to joining FERC, she was the executive vice president and acting CEO of the utility company National Grid plc. She began her legal career at the law firm of Ropes & Gray.

References

External links
 Biography at FERC

Living people
21st-century American lawyers
Obama administration personnel
Trump administration personnel
Massachusetts lawyers
Princeton University alumni
Harvard Law School alumni
People associated with Ropes & Gray
Federal Energy Regulatory Commission chairpersons
Year of birth missing (living people)